This is a list of alumni of the UCLA School of Theater, Film and Television.

Shane Acker, filmmaker, 9
Ana Lily Amirpour, filmmaker, A Girl Walks Home Alone at Night
Corey Allen, actor, film director, writer, television director, and producer, Rebel Without a Cause 
Allison Anders, filmmaker, Gas, Food, Lodging
MK Asante, author, Buck: A Memoir, filmmaker, The Black Candle, executive producer, While Black with MK Asante
Jacoba Atlas, television executive, senior producer at NBC News and TBS, vice president at CNN and PBS
Danilo Bach, writer, Beverly Hills Cop
Carroll Ballard, director, Fly Away Home
Beth Behrs, actress, 2 Broke Girls
Harve Bennett, producer, Star Trek
Corbin Bernsen, actor, Psych, L.A. Law
Jeff Berry, historian and author
Bruce Bilson, director, Get Smart
Dustin Lance Black, screenwriter, J. Edgar, Milk
Jack Black, actor, Kung Fu Panda, School of Rock
Shane Black, writer/director, Lethal Weapon, Iron Man 3
Thomas Bliss, producer
Roger Blonder, short film animation
Carol Burnett, comedian
Charles Burnett, filmmaker, To Sleep with Anger
Stephen H. Burum, cinematographer, Mission: Impossible
Giacun Caduff, producer of La femme et le TGV
Sheila Callaghan, writer/producer, Shameless
Patricia Cardoso, filmmaker, Real Women Have Curves
Nancy Cartwright, voice actress, The Simpsons
Migdia Chinea, writer, The Incredible Hulk
Bert Convy, host, Tattletales, Super Password
Francis Ford Coppola, filmmaker, The Godfather franchise
Alex Cox, filmmaker, Fear and Loathing in Las Vegas
Steve Cuden, screenwriter, Jekyll & Hyde musical
Dean Cundey, cinematographer, Apollo 13
Julie Dash, filmmaker, Daughters of the Dust
Jonathan Dayton, director, Little Miss Sunshine, Ruby Sparks
James Dean, actor, Rebel Without a Cause
Joyce DeWitt, actress, Three's Company
Jesse Draper, actress, talk show host, The Valley Girl Show
Moctesuma Esparza, producer, Gettysburg
Jamaa Fanaka, filmmaker, Penitentiary
Valerie Faris, director, Little Miss Sunshine, Ruby Sparks
Teshome Gabriel, cinema scholar and professor at the UCLA School of Theater, Film and Television, expert on cinema in Africa and the developing world 
Sacha Gervasi, filmmaker, Hitchcock
Alex Gibney, filmmaker, Going Clear: Scientology and the Prison of Belief
Geoffrey Gilmore, director, Tribeca Film Festival
Maria Giese, director, activist for women directors, [When Saturday Comes], [DGA ACLU EEOC investigation for women directors]
Joanna Gleason, actress, The Wedding Planner
Dan Gordon, screenwriter, The Hurricane
Christopher Gorham, actor, Covert Affairs
Kristin Hanggi, Broadway director, Rock of Ages
Catherine Hardwicke, director, Twilight
Mariska Hargitay, actress, Law & Order: Special Victims Unit
Marielle Heller, director, A Beautiful Day in the Neighborhood, Can You Ever Forgive Me?, The Diary of a Teenage Girl
Felicia D. Henderson, writer/producer, Fringe, Gossip Girl
Jim Herzfeld, screenwriter, Meet the Fockers
Colin Higgins, screenwriter, The Best Little Whorehouse in Texas
Michael Hitchcock, actor/writer, Glee
Todd Holland, showrunner, Malcolm in the Middle
Randall Jahnson, screenwriter, The Doors
Anne-Marie Johnson, actress, What's Happening Now!!
Laeta Kalogridis, writer/producer, Terminator Genisys
Judy Kaye, Broadway actress
Gil Kenan, director, Poltergeist
Russ Kingston, actor, film editor
David Koepp, screenwriter, Jurassic Park, Spider-Man, Mission Impossible
Scott Kosar, writer, The Machinist
Neil Landau, writer, Don't Tell Mom the Babysitter's Dead
Deborah Nadoolman Landis, costume designer, Coming to America, Michael Jackson's "Thriller"
Janet Leahy, executive producer, Mad Men
Justin Lin filmmaker, Fast & Furious 6
Erica Lindbeck, voice actress 
Russell Mael, singer-songwriter, Sparks
SJ Main Muñoz, television and film director, American Horror Stories
Ray Manzarek, keyboardist, The Doors
Courtney Marsh, filmmaker, Chau, Beyond the Lines
Steve Martin, actor/writer, It's Complicated, L.A. Story
Jim Morrison, lead singer and lyricist, The Doors
Gregory Nava, filmmaker, American Family
Victor Nuñez, filmmaker, Ulee's Gold
Alexander Payne, filmmaker, Nebraska, The Descendants
Nasim Pedrad, comedian, Saturday Night Live
Robert Roy Pool, writer, Armageddon
Doug Pray, filmmaker, Levitated Mass
Gina Prince-Bythewood, filmmaker, Beyond the Lights, The Secret Lives of Bees
John Rando, Broadway director, On the Town
Rob Reiner, actor/writer/producer, New Girl, Flipped, The Bucket List
Tim Robbins, actor, The Brink, Mystic River, The Shawshank Redemption
Scott Rosenberg, producer/writer, Zoo, October Road, Con Air
Eric Roth, writer, Extremely Loud and Incredibly Close, The Curious Case of Benjamin Button
Pietro Scalia, editor, Black Hawk Down, Gladiator, Good Will Hunting
Paul Schrader, writer, Raging Bull, Taxi Driver
Tom Shadyac, filmmaker, Bruce Almighty, Evan Almighty
Chuck Sheetz, animation director, The Simpsons, Recess
Brad Silberling, filmmaker, Lemony Snicket's A Series of Unfortunate Events
David Silverman, animation producer, The Simpsons
Tom Skerritt, actor, Ted, Picket Fences, Top Gun
Penelope Spheeris, director, Wayne's World
Nicole St. John, voice actress, Futurama
Ben Stiller, actor/writer/director, The Secret Life of Walter Mitty, Zoolander
Michael Stuhlbarg, actor, Boardwalk Empire
Joel Surnow, writer, 24
Jorma Taccone, writer, Saturday Night Live
George Takei, actor, Star Trek
Ham Tran, director, The Anniversary (2003 film)
Gore Verbinski, director, Rango, Pirates of the Caribbean
David S. Ward, writer, Sleepless in Seattle, The Sting
Aron Warner, producer, Shrek franchise
Mitch Watson, animation writer, All Hail King Julien
Kevin Weisman, actor, Alias
Jenna Westover, writer, I am not OK with this!
Marianne Wibberley, writer, National Treasure franchise
Gregory Widen, writer, Highlander
Cress Williams, actor, Prison Break
Hoyt Yeatman, visual effects, Jack the Giant Slayer
Daphne Zuniga, actress, One Tree Hill, Melrose Place
Chih-yen Yee, writer/director, Blue Gate Crossing
Ayn Carrillo Gailey, writer, Nice Girl Like You
Usmar Ismail, director, Lewat Djam Malam
Kerem Çatay, film producer, Ay Yapim
Kevin Tsai, television host/writer, Kangsi Coming

References